Nematolebias is a genus of fish in the family Rivulidae. These threatened annual killifish are endemic temporary waters, like pools, in the Atlantic Forest in Rio de Janeiro state, Brazil (the equally threatened killifish genera Leptolebias and Notholebias are restricted to the same state).

Like other killifish, the males are more colorful than females.

Species
There are currently three recognized species in this genus:

 Nematolebias catimbau W. J. E. M. Costa, Amorim & Aranha, 2014
 Nematolebias papilliferus W. J. E. M. Costa, 2002
 Nematolebias whitei G. S. Myers, 1942 (Rio pearlfish)

References

Rivulidae
Freshwater fish genera